Pietro Fumasoni Biondi (4 September 1872 – 12 July 1960) was an Italian Cardinal of the Roman Catholic Church who served as Prefect of the Sacred Congregation for the Propagation of the Faith in the Roman Curia from 1933 until his death, and was elevated to the cardinalate in 1933.

Biography
Fumasoni Biondi was born in Rome to the aristocratic Filippo and Gertrude (née Roselli) Fumasoni Biondi; he had a sister who entered the Missionary Sisters of the Sacred Heart of Jesus and became known as Mother Gertrude. After studying at the Pontifical Roman Seminary, he was ordained to the priesthood by Cardinal Lucido Parocchi on 17 April 1897. From 1897 to 1916, he was a professor at the Pontifical Urbaniana University and then an official of the Sacred Congregation for the Propagation of the Faith.

On 14 November 1916, Biondi was appointed Apostolic Delegate to the East Indies and Titular Archbishop of Dioclea. He received his episcopal consecration on the following 10 December from Cardinal Domenico Serafini, OSB, with Bishops Joseph Legrand, CSC, and Agostino Zampini, OSA, serving as co-consecrators, in the chapel of the Urbaniana University. In this post, he actively tried to improve relations between the Vatican and the Emperor of Japan. Biondi was later named Apostolic Delegate to Japan on 6 December 1919, Secretary of the Congregation for the Propagation of the Faith on 14 June 1921 and Apostolic Delegate to the United States on 14 December 1922. In 1927, he declared the Vatican had no interest in the presidential campaign of Al Smith, the Catholic governor of New York.

Pope Pius XI created him Cardinal-Priest of Santa Croce in Gerusalemme in the consistory of 13 March 1933, in advance for his appointment as Prefect of the Sacred Congregation for the Propagation of the Faith three days later, on 16 March. Cardinal Fumasoni Bondi served as papal legate to the National Eucharistic Congress in Teramo on 20 August 1935. He was one of the cardinal electors who participated in the 1939 papal conclave, and again in the conclave of 1958.

Biondi died in Rome, at age 87. He is buried in the Campo Verano.

References

External links
Cardinals of the Holy Roman Church
Catholic-Hierarchy 

20th-century Italian cardinals
Apostolic Nuncios to Japan
Apostolic Nuncios to the United States
Clergy from Rome
1872 births
Pontifical Roman Seminary alumni
1960 deaths
Members of the Congregation for the Propagation of the Faith